Muraka Bog (also Muraka Wetland Complex) is a bog in Ida-Viru County, Estonia.

The area of the complex is 12,793 ha.

The complex consists of four bogs: Muraka, Ratva, Seli and Virunurme Bog.

References

Ida-Viru County
Bogs of Estonia